is a song by Japanese singer-songwriter Rina Aiuchi. It was released on 15 October 2003 through Giza Studio, as the sixth single from her third studio album A.I.R., simultaneously with the album and the fan book, Made in Rina 2003. The song reached number seven in Japan and has sold over 27,264 copies nationwide. The song served as the theme song to the three Japanese television shows, Angura Now, √f and Tabi-Dachi!.

Track listing

Charts

Weekly charts

Certification and sales

|-
! scope="row"| Japan (RIAJ)
| 
| 27,264 
|-
|}

Release history

References

2003 singles
2003 songs
J-pop songs
Song recordings produced by Daiko Nagato
Songs written by Rina Aiuchi